Lost Dog Creek is a stream in the U.S. state of South Dakota.

Some say Lost Dog Creek was named from an incident when a dog ran away from a nearby settlement, while others believe the name recalls an incident when an Indian heard a lost dog howling near the creek.

See also
List of rivers of South Dakota

References

Rivers of Jackson County, South Dakota
Rivers of South Dakota